The MAX Sessions is an Australian television program broadcast on MAX. It features intimate performances, by both Australian and over-seas artists, played mostly acoustically in a live set up, similar to MTV Unplugged.

History
The MAX Sessions were originally hosted by Crowded House drummer, Paul Hester, but after his suicide in March 2005, the hosting spot was taken by MAX  TV personality Chit Chat Von Loopin Stab . As of late 2007, other  MAX TV personality Yumi, took the hosting roll. The show began in early 2004 with rock group Coldplay headlining the first episode. Other artists, both Australian and from over-seas have appeared in its 30+ episodes. All but a few of the MAX Sessions broadcasts have been directed by Bernie Zelvis.

The MAX Sessions are mainly filmed at the Sydney Opera House but are occasionally done in other special venues around Australia. The shows tagline is A live and intimate performance, this is because it is live to an intimate audience of only about 30 people. The only way to obtain tickets to a Max Session is to win them on the MAX Session website.

On 3 November 2007, MAX, aired a special 90-minute MAX Session, twilight concert featuring Australian band Powderfinger. The Concert For The Cure was held to help raise awareness for breast cancer and was filmed live on the outside steps of the Sydney Opera House. This performance was indeed quite intimate, as the only people allowed to view the concert were breast cancer sufferers and survivors as well as their family members.

The show has won four Australian subscription television industry awards (ASTRA Awards)

Max Sessions
The following is a list of artists who have performed on The MAX Sessions. The list is done alphabetically and not in the order that they were originally aired.

Alex Lloyd
Australian Icons - (featuring) James Reyne, Mark Seymour, Johnny Diesel, Joe Camilleri and more.
Bernard Fanning
Blondie
Chicago
Chris Isaak
Coldplay (first and fiftieth Max Session)
Darren Hayes (with special guest Delta Goodrem) 
Delta Goodrem
Ed Kowalczyk from Live
Eskimo Joe
The Finn Brothers with guest drummer Paul Hester
George
INXS
Jack Johnson (in park)
Jack Johnson (solo)
James Blunt
Jamie Cullum
Jimmy Barnes
John Butler Trio
John Mayer
Kasey Chambers
k.d. lang
Keith Urban
Michael Buble'
Missy Higgins
Moby
Neil Finn
Newton Faulkner
Paul Kelly
Pete Murray
Powderfinger: Concert For The Cure  -- (with special guests Missy Higgins & Nic Cester from JET)
Sarah McLachlan
Slash & Myles Kennedy
The Cat Empire
The Whitlams
Toni Collette
Xavier Rudd

External links
Official site - page with MAX Sessions videos
Concert For The Cure Official site

Max (Australian TV channel) original programming
Australian music television series
2004 Australian television series debuts